The La Mesa Ecopark is a public park located in Greater Lagro, Quezon City, Metro Manila, the Philippines.

History

After years of neglect, the park underwent a renovation under the "Save La Mesa Watershed Project", a collaboration between Bantay Kalikasan, the Metropolitan Waterworks and Sewerage System and the local government of Quezon City. It was reopened in September 2004 and was renamed as "La Mesa Ecopark".

In 2019, it was proposed that the park be renamed as Gina Lopez Ecopark to commemorate Lingkod Kapamilya Foundation chairperson Gina Lopez who in 1999 established Bantay Kalikasan which had a role in the ecopark's rehabilitation.

Facilities
Among the activities that can be done by visitors in the park are hiking, mountain-biking, horseback riding, rappelling, zip-lining and fishing. They can also paddle boat ride in the lagoon. The park also has an "Ecotrail" and an orchidarium.

The park also hosts a swimming complex which was opened in 2011. It had previous one which was destroyed by Typhoon Ketsana (Ondoy) in September 2009. In a 2011 report, the park has annual visitor rate of 280 thousand people.

Gallery

References

External links

Parks in Quezon City
Birdwatching sites in the Philippines